Kim Wall is a British actor who has appeared in recurring roles in many British comedy series, including The All New Alexei Sayle Show, The Armstrong and Miller Show, Heartburn Hotel, World of Pub, Big Train, Nighty Night, Angelo's and Al Murray's Multiple Personality Disorder.

In film, he has appeared in The War Zone and Holy Flying Circus. In 2004 he played one of the lead roles in a Salford production of Hamish McColl and Sean Foley's The Play What I Wrote. In September 2021, he portrayed the role of Clive Cookson in two episodes of the BBC soap opera Doctors.

Filmography

Film

Television

Radio

References

External links

 Kim Wall at British Comedy Guide

20th-century births
Living people
British male television actors
Place of birth missing (living people)
Year of birth missing (living people)